The Twickenham Museum is a volunteer-run museum in Twickenham in the London Borough of Richmond upon Thames. It is located opposite St Mary's parish church at 25 The Embankment, Twickenham TW1 3DU, an 18th-century three-storey building which has been listed Grade II by Historic England and was donated to the museum.

An independent museum, the Twickenham Museum is run by a registered charity that was first registered in 1993.

The museum's area of interest is the history of Teddington, Twickenham, Whitton and the Hamptons, which, until local government boundary changes in 1965, formed the Municipal Borough of Twickenham. It collects, researches and displays archives, artefacts and information from these areas and provides related historical information on its website. The museum also mounts exhibitions.

In 2014, it received £9000 from the Heritage Lottery Fund's Then and Now programme for a project on the 1914 Christmas truce during the First World War that led to a soldier, Frank Edwards, kicking a football when fighting the Battle of Loos in 1915.

See also
Eel Pie Island Museum
Museum of Richmond
Orleans House Gallery

Notes

References

External links
 Official website

1993 establishments in England
Charities based in London
Grade II listed buildings in the London Borough of Richmond upon Thames
Grade II listed museum buildings
History museums in London
History of Middlesex
History of the London Borough of Richmond upon Thames
Local museums in London
Museums established in 1993
Museums in Twickenham